"Fall of Rome" is the first single from Australian rock musician James Reyne's self-titled debut solo studio album (1987).

Background and promotion
Reyne was the lead singer of Australian rock band Australian Crawl, who played their final show is at the Perth Entertainment Centre on 1 February 1986. Following this, Reyne began work on his solo career. Reyne performed "Fall of Rome" on the final episode of iconic TV series Countdown on 19 July 1987.

Track listings
7-inch and CD single
 "Fall of Rome" (edit) – 3:44
 "The Traveller" – 4:18

12-inch single
A1. "Fall of Rome" (rock mix by Mike Ging) – 5:52
A2. "The Traveller" – 4:18
B1. "Fall of Rome" (edited version) – 3:42
B2. "Fall of Rome" (instrumental) – 5:25

Charts

Weekly charts

Year-end charts

References

1987 singles
1987 songs
Capitol Records singles
James Reyne songs
Songs written by James Reyne